In taxonomy, Hyphomonas is a genus of the Hyphomonadaceae.

References

Further reading

Scientific journals

Scientific books

Scientific databases

External links

Caulobacterales
Psychrophiles
Bacteria genera